Sprunk may refer to:

Jon Sprunk, American fantasy author
Sprunk, former stage name of actor Gary Busey

Sprunk, a fictional drink in the Grand Theft Auto video game series